Physonota unipunctata, known generally as horsemint tortoise beetle, is a species of leaf beetle in the family Chrysomelidae. Other common names include the beebalm tortoise beetle, bergamot tortoise beetle, and one-spotted tortoise beetle. It is found in North America.

Subspecies
These two subspecies belong to the species Physonota unipunctata:
 Physonota unipunctata arizonae Schaeffer
 Physonota unipunctata unipunctata

References

Further reading

 
 
 

Cassidinae
Articles created by Qbugbot
Beetles described in 1824